Audrey Jene Deemer (September 28, 1930 – September 25, 2012) was a utility infielder and pitcher for the Chicago Colleens, Fort Wayne Daisies, and Springfield Sallies of the All-American Girls Professional Baseball League in 1950. She played in 25 games, hitting .106 with nine hits, 14 runs scored, and six stolen bases.

Personal life
She was born in Steubenville, Ohio. Following her playing career, she worked as a police dispatcher for the Powhatan Point Police Department of Powhatan Point, Ohio. She died in Cadiz, Ohio, three days before her 82nd birthday.

Career statistics
Batting

References

1930 births
2012 deaths
All-American Girls Professional Baseball League players
Chicago Colleens players
Fort Wayne Daisies players
Springfield Sallies players
21st-century American women